The 2nd Daytime Emmy Awards were held on Thursday, May 15, 1975, and broadcast on ABC to commemorate excellence in daytime programming from the previous year (1974). The event was hosted by Monty Hall and Stephanie Edwards. It was uniquely held on board the S.S. Dayliner in the Hudson River between New York City and New Jersey. It had cast off from New York's Pier 81 with 600 invited guests being accommodated for a luncheon before the awards telecast between 1:30-3 p.m. Eastern Daylight Time. The telecast preempted Let's Make a Deal, The $10,000 Pyramid and The Big Showdown.

Winners in each category are in bold.

Outstanding Daytime Drama Series

Another World
Days of Our Lives
The Young and the Restless

Outstanding Actor in a Daytime Drama Series

Macdonald Carey (Dr. Tom Horton, Days of our Lives)
Bill Hayes (Doug Williams, Days of our Lives)
John Beradino (Dr. Steve Hardy, General Hospital)

Outstanding Actress in a Daytime Drama Series

Ruth Warrick (Phoebe Tyler, All My Children)
Susan Flannery (Laura Spencer, Days of our Lives)
Susan Seaforth (Julie Olson, Days of our Lives)
Rachel Ames (Audrey Hardy, General Hospital)

Outstanding Actor in a Daytime Drama Special

Bradford Dillman (The ABC Afternoon Playbreak - episode "Last Bride of Salem" (#2.6))

Best Actress in a Daytime Drama Special

Kay Lenz (The ABC Afternoon Playbreak)
Diane Baker (The ABC Afternoon Playbreak)
Julie Kavner (The ABC Afternoon Playbreak)

Outstanding Individual Director in a Daytime Drama Series
Ira Cirker (Another World)
Joseph Behar (Days of our Lives)
Richard Dunlap (The Young and the Restless)

Outstanding Daytime Drama Series Writing
 Another World
 Days of our Lives
 The Young and the Restless

Outstanding Daytime Drama Special
The ABC Afternoon Playbreak: Ira Barmak (executive producer); Lila Garrett (producer); ABC - for episode "The Girl Who Couldn't Lose".
The ABC Afternoon Playbreak: Robert Michael Lewis(executive producer); George Paris (producer); ABC - for episode "The Last Bride of Salem".

Outstanding Game or Audience Participation Show

The Hollywood Squares - Heatter & Quigley; NBC
Jeopardy! - Robert Rudin; NBC
The $10,000 Pyramid - Bob Stewart; ABC
Let's Make a Deal - Stefan Hatos; ABC

Outstanding Host in a Game Show or Audience Participation Show

Peter Marshall (The Hollywood Squares, NBC)
Gene Rayburn (Match Game '73, CBS)
Monty Hall (Let's Make a Deal, ABC)

Outstanding Entertainment - Children's Series
Star Trek: The Animated Series - Lou Scheimer, Norm Prescott (producers); NBC
Captain Kangaroo - Jim Hirschfeld (producer); CBS
The Pink Panther Show - Friz Freleng (producer); NBC

References

002
1975 television awards